John Henry Slattery (? – 1933) served in the Colorado State House of Representatives from 1911 to 1914, and he was speaker of the Colorado General Assembly in 1914.

He was born in New York City. He died in 1933 in Colorado.

References

Members of the Colorado House of Representatives
1933 deaths
Year of birth missing